The 2018 Women's Regional Super50 was a 50-over women's cricket competition that took place in the West Indies. It took place in June 2018, with 6 teams taking part and all matches taking place in Jamaica. Barbados won the tournament, their second 50-over title.

The tournament followed the 2018 Regional Women's Twenty20 Championship.

Competition format 
Teams played in a league of six, playing three matches. Matches were played using a one day format with 50 overs per side. The top team in the group were crowned the Champions.

The group worked on a points system with positions being based on the total points. Points were awarded as follows:

Win: 4 points 
Tie: 2 points 
Loss: 0 points.
Abandoned/No Result: 2 points.
Bonus Point: 1 bonus point available per match.

Points table

Source: CricketArchive

Statistics

Most runs

Source: CricketArchive

Most wickets

Source: CricketArchive

References

Women's Super50 Cup
2018 in West Indian cricket